Bandar Nusa Bayu (بنـــدر نوســـا بايـــو) or Nusa Bayu is a township at the city of Iskandar Puteri, district of Johor Bahru, State of Johor Darul Ta'zim, Malaysia. The township is bordered by Setia Eco Garden and Jelutong hill forest to the north, Second Link Expressway to the west, Nusajaya Southern Industry Logistic Center (SILC) to the south, and GP Prima Transport Hub to the east. The township is part of the Iskandar Malaysia Flagship B and the Iskandar Puteri Master Plan. Formerly in the Nusajaya Master Plan, Nusa Bayu was known as Nusajaya Industrial Park, together with SILC. The development commenced in 2010 and began to be occupied since 2013 onward.

Etimology 
The "Nusa" initial is the standard development name in Iskandar Puteri as per Urban Design Guideline (UDG) established in 2008. The word is a Sanskrit word derived from the former name of Iskandar Puteri, Nusajaya. The second word "Bayu" is a Malay personification of air. It was named after the geographical profile of Nusa Bayu.

Development
1. Taman Nusa Bayu
2. Taman Nusantara Prima
3. Taman Bayu Nusantara
4. Bayu Angkasa Apartment

Taman Nusa Bayu
Taman Nusa Bayu is the first and the main development in Nusa Bayu. It was developed by Nusajaya Height Development Sdn Bhd, a subsidiary of UEM Land, the master developer of Nusajaya (now, Iskandar Puteri).

Taman Nusantara Prima
Taman Nusantara Prima was developed by Seloga Holdings Bhd. The development is located at the westmost area of Bandar Nusa Bayu and was occupied since 2016.

Taman Bayu Nusantara
Taman Bayu Nusantara was developed under the "Rumah Mampu Milik Johor" (Johor Affordable Home) scheme by UEM Sunrise Berhad. The development is located at the eastmost area of Bandar Nusa Bayu and was occupied since 2017.

Bayu Angkasa Apartment
Bayu Angkasa is a twin medium rise apartment located between the proposed Mosque and Multipurpose Hall in Nusa Bayu at the foot of Jelutong hills. The apartment was developed by UEM Sunrise Berhad and has been occupied since 2018.

Amenities

School

Primary Education
SK Nusantara (2.5KM)
SK Pulai (4.3KM)
Tenby International School (4.5KM)
SJKC Pai Sze (4.5KM)

Secondary Education
SMK Nusantara (2.5KM)

Tertiary Education
Kolej Komuniti Gelang Patah (0KM)
Malborough College (7KM)
Educity (8.5KM)
Universiti Teknologi Malaysia (UTM) (17KM)

Mosque
Masjid Nusa Bayu is a major mosque in Nusa Bayu proposed at the plot next to the Bayu Angkasa Apartment. The plot has been acquired in 2015 by Majlis Agama Islam Johor. Committee for construction of Masjid Nusa Bayu was founded in 2020. In 2021 Jabatan Agama Islam Negeri Johor has approved the plan of  Masjid Nusa Bayu and the development plan was submitted to Iskandar Puteri City Council for approval in 2022. The funding for the construction of this mosque was raised through public donation. Upon completion, the mosque will serve as praying hall for 40,000 Muslims in Nusa Bayu and surrounding development including workers from industrial area at GP Prima, SILC, IBP, I-Park, Bioexcell, Biocon and I-Tech Valley.

Recreational Park

Nusa Bayu Lake Park
Nusa Bayu Valley Park
Nusa Bayu Hill Park
Playground
NS Sport Centre

Transportation

GP Sentral Bus Terminal (800m)
Gelang Patah Bus & Taxi Terminal (4KM)

See also
Iskandar Malaysia
Iskandar Puteri
UEM Sunrise
Kota Iskandar
Johor Bahru
Pulai Mutiara

References

Iskandar Puteri
Townships in Johor